Lychnophoriopsis  is a genus of Brazilian plants in the family Asteraceae.

 Species
All the known species are endemic to the State of Minas Gerais in Brazil.
 Lychnophoriopsis candelabrum (Sch.Bip.) H.Rob.  
 Lychnophoriopsis damazioi (Beauverd) H.Rob. 
 Lychnophoriopsis hatschbachii H.Rob.  
 Lychnophoriopsis heterotheca Sch.Bip.

References

Vernonieae
Asteraceae genera
Endemic flora of Brazil